Music & Letters is an academic journal published quarterly by Oxford University Press with a focus on musicology. The journal sponsors the Music & Letters Trust, twice-yearly cash awards of variable amounts to support research in the music field.

A. H. Fox Strangways established the journal in 1920 and served as editor-in-chief until 1937. Eric Blom served as editor from 1937 to 1950 and again from 1954 to 1959. Other editors-in-chief have included Richard Capell, J.A. Westrup, Denis Arnold, Edward Olleson, Nigel Fortune, John Whenham, and Tim Carter.

References

External links 
 

Music journals
Oxford University Press academic journals
Publications established in 1920